The Ethiopian Catholic Eparchy of Emdeber is an eparchy (Eastern Catholic diocese) of the Ethiopian Catholic Church, a metropolitan Eastern Catholic Church. It is a suffragan of the Ethiopian Catholic Archeparchy of Addis Ababa.

It is named after the town of Emdibir, where it has its cathedral, St. Anthony Cathedral, Endibir.

Its name, like that of the town, is transliterated in different ways: Eparchy of Emdibir, Endibir, Endeber and Indibir.

History 
 25 November 2003: Established as Eparchy of Emdeber with territory taken from the Metropolitan Archeparchy of Addis Ababa.

Ordinaries 
(Ethiopian rite)
''Eparchs of Emdeber 
 Musie Ghebreghiorghis, O.F.M. Cap. (November 25, 2003 – present)

The Eparchy
Emdibir Eparchy was established in late November 2003, becoming the third eparchy within Ethiopia of the Ethiopian Catholic Church. Its setting up followed long years of Catholic presence and service in the area.

Located southwest of Addis Ababa, the capital of Ethiopia, the eparchy covers the Guraghe Zone of the Southern Nations, Nationalities, and Peoples' Regional State (SNNPRS) and part of South–Western Shoa Zone of Oromiya Regional State. It is bordered to the northwest by the Western Shoa Zone of Oromiya Regional State, to the south by the Hadiya and the Kembata Timbaro Zones of SNNPRS, to the east by Silte Zone of SNNPRS, and to the west by the Gibe River. The total land area of the eparchy is about 12,000 square kilometers with an estimated population of 4 million. The major ethnic groups are the Guraghe and the Oromo, with a variety of minority ethnic communities.

Emdibir Catholic Secretariat (EmCS)
Emdibir Catholic Secretariat (EmCS) was established in April 2004 with the mandate to coordinate and facilitate all pastoral, social and development activities of the Catholic Church in the Eparchy of Emdibir. The overall goal and objective of EmCS is promoting “Human Integral Development” which implies the development of people both materially and spiritually.

The Secretariat has two main wings/departments. One is the Pastoral Activities Co-Coordinating wing, which deals with pastoral activities of the Church in general. The other wing is the Social and Development Coordination wing, which mainly deals with the socio-economic and development promotion activities of the Church within the jurisdiction of the Eparchy. The Secretariat Office is now well equipped by qualified professional personnel to discharge its duties and responsibilities in pastoral activities and promoting socio-economic development activities of the Church for the communities/societies in the Eparchy.

See also 
 Catholic dioceses in Ethiopia
 Roman Catholicism in Ethiopia
 Apostolic Prefecture of Endeber

References

Sources and external links 
 GCatholic.org
 Catholic Hierarchy
 Ethiopian Catholic Secretariat

Catholic dioceses in Ethiopia
Christian organizations established in 2003
Roman Catholic dioceses and prelatures established in the 21st century
Southern Nations, Nationalities, and Peoples' Region
Ethiopian Catholic Church